Peculiarities of the National Hunt in Winter Season is a 2000 Russian comedy film.

Plot
Kuzmich and Semyonov feel bored at the 13th cordon until the season of "checks" and "inspections" begins. The first inspectors are from the Ministry of Forestry, followed by two more from the environmental department. The heroes even have to drink tea for a while since the environmental leader is a teetotal lady who also hates hunting. Later, Leva Soloveichik and General Ivolgin join the company. As always the company survives a lot of absurd but completely legitimate adventures. The philosophical story-parable compiled by Kuzmich about the Chinese hunter Hu Zhou who comprehends all the secrets of Russian hunting and tries to understand the Russian soul, is carried throughout the storyline.

Cast
Alexey Buldakov — General Alexei Mikhailovich Ivolgin
Viktor Bychkov — huntsman Kuzmich
Sergei Gusinsky — militiaman Semyonov (voiced by Alexander Polovtsev)
Semyon Strugachyov — Leva Soloveichik
Andrey Fedortsev — Oleg Pyatakov
Yury Kuznetsov — Kurtzov Yury Nikolaevich
Andrei Zibrov — Rechnikov Igor Valentinovich
Irina Osnovina — Olga Valeryevna Maslyuk
Andrey Krasko — border guard at the Finnish border
Ivan Krasko — Vladimir Lenin (rescuer of the Ministry of Emergency Situations)
Mikhail Porechenkov — commander of the outpost on the Finnish border

References

External links
 

2000s Russian-language films
Films directed by Aleksandr Rogozhkin
2000 comedy films
2000 films
Russian comedy films